Yau Cheung, previously Chui Cheung is one of the 40 constituencies in the Kwun Tong District of Hong Kong which was created in 2011.

Covering Yau Chui Court, part of Yau Lai Estate, Yau Mei Court and Yau Tong Centre in Yau Tong, the constituency has an estimated population of 17,969.

Councillors represented

Election results

2010s

References

Constituencies of Hong Kong
Constituencies of Kwun Tong District Council
2011 establishments in Hong Kong
Constituencies established in 2011
Yau Tong